Black River is a  river on the Upper Peninsula of the U.S. state of Michigan.

Tributaries (from the mouth):
 Bruce Creek
 Buto Lake
 Tower Lake
 Unnamed stream
 Nirish Lake
 Granite Lake
 Unnamed stream
 Lake Lory
 Mud Lake
 Twin Lake
 Goose Lake
 Perch Lake
 Horseshoe Lake

References 

Rivers of Michigan
Rivers of Marquette County, Michigan
Tributaries of Lake Michigan